Anna Angelova (born 9 January 1971) is a Bulgarian fencer. She competed in the women's individual foil event at the 1996 Summer Olympics.

References

External links
 

1971 births
Living people
Bulgarian female foil fencers
Olympic fencers of Bulgaria
Fencers at the 1996 Summer Olympics
Sportspeople from Plovdiv